Man Alive! is the 8th studio album by Stephen Stills, released in 2005. It is a mixture of old and new recordings. Some were dated in the notes of the box set Carry On as follows: "Ain't It Always" from December 1976, "Spanish Suite" from April 1979 during the sessions of his unfinished 1979 album, "Feed the People" from 1989 but with everything but the backing vocals replaced later, and "I Don't Get It" in 1991. Zimmer's biography of Crosby, Stills & Nash places "Acadienne" with songs for the CSNY Looking Forward album, and based on the personnel it is from April 1998.  Dates of the others are unknown. "Drivin' Thunder" appeared the CSNY album American Dream in 1988, but Stills wrote new lyrics for the version on this album. Stills introduced "Heart's Gate" as a new song in concert in 2003. Graham Nash sings on "Acadienne", "Feed the People", and "Wounded World", which he co-wrote. Neil Young plays on "Different Man" and "Round the Bend", while Herbie Hancock plays on "Spanish Suite". Stills drew the back and front cover.

Track listing

Personnel 
 Stephen Stills – lead vocals, acoustic piano (1), lead guitar (1), guitars (2-13), bass (2, 4-6, 13), percussion (2, 5, 11, 13), backing vocals (2, 4, 5, 11), organ (4), keyboards (5, 7, 10)
 Mike Finnigan – organ (1, 2, 6, 7, 10, 11), backing vocals (1, 2, 12, 13), accordion (12)
 Herbie Hancock – acoustic piano (13)
 George Terry – rhythm guitar (1)
 Neil Young – guitars (4, 8), harmony vocals (8)
 George "Chocolate" Perry – bass (1), backing vocals (1)
 Gerald Johnson – bass (7, 10-13)
 Joe Vitale – drums (1, 2, 5-7, 10-12), percussion (1, 4, 12), backing vocals (1), organ (5), keyboards (6), synthesizers (11)
 Russ Kunkel – drums (4), percussion (4)
 Billy Meeker – drums (13)
 Joe Vitale Jr. – percussion (2, 6)
 Joe Lala – percussion (12, 13)
 Willie Bobo – percussion (13)
 Pete Escovedo – percussion (13)
 Jimmy Zavelo – harp (9, 10)
 Steve Madaio – trumpet (13)
 Dorian Holley – backing vocals (2, 5-7, 10)
 Brooks Hunnicutt – backing vocals (2, 13)
 Mortonette Jenkins – backing vocals (2, 5-7, 10)
 Marlena Jeter – backing vocals (2, 5-7, 10)
 Graham Nash – backing vocals (2, 10, 12)
 Jennifer Stills – backing vocals (5)

Production 
 Russ Kunkel – executive producer, digital editing (3, 4)
 Stephen Stills – executive producer, producer, engineer (5), art direction, cover concept, front and back cover drawings 
 Joe Vitale – executive producer, producer (1, 2, 4-8, 10-13), engineer (1-12), digital editing (13)
 Michael Braunstein – engineer (1, 13)
 Joe Vitale Jr. – digital editing (1, 2, 4, 6, 8, 10, 13)
 Andy Brohard – digital editing (3)
 John Porter – digital editing (6)
 John Hiler – mixing
 Bernie Grundman – mastering at Bernie Grundman Mastering (Hollywood, California)
 Gary Burden – design
 Jenice Heo – design
 Henry Diltz – photography 
 Jake Schoellkopf – inside folder photography

References

2005 albums
Stephen Stills albums